Rodney Pora is a professional rugby league footballer who played in the 2000s and 2010s. He played for Agmark Gurias in Papua New Guinea. He is a Papua New Guinea international.

He has been named in the Papua New Guinea training squad for the 2008 Rugby League World Cup.

He was named in the PNG squad for the 2008 Rugby League World Cup.

Pora was named as part of the Papua New Guinea squad for the 2009 Pacific Cup.

References

External links

Living people
Papua New Guinean rugby league players
Papua New Guinea national rugby league team players
Mendi Muruks players
Rabaul Gurias players
Rugby league props
Whitehaven R.L.F.C. players
Year of birth missing (living people)